Deylam is a city in Bushehr Province, Iran.

Deylam may also refer to:
 Deylam, Khuzestan
 Deylam, former name of Gilan Province
 Deylam-e Jadid, Khuzestan Province
 Deylam-e Olya, Khuzestan Province
 Deylam-e Sofla, Khuzestan Province